Gocha Jamarauli (born 23 July 1971) is a Georgian former professional football midfielder.

He collected 62 caps and as of 2008 is the fourth most capped player in Georgia.

Club career
His club career started in FC Dinamo Tbilisi when Georgian football league was formed in 1990, the Dinamo team won several titles in a row, and Jamarauli was a key player during this period. In 1996, he wanted to play abroad, and moved to Russian (North Ossetian) team FC Alania Vladikavkaz, and the next season to Trabzonspor of Turkey.

Neither spell was very successful, so he got a transfer to Swiss club FC Zürich in summer 1998 where he spent four seasons until leaving following a contract dispute. Via another Swiss team, FC Luzern, he joined FC Metalurh Donetsk in the Ukrainian league, where he would spend two and a half season. Following brief spells with Dinamo Tbilisi and Anorthosis Famagusta the midfielder announced his retirement from professional football.

International career
He was a regular in the national team, and played 62 international matches and scored 6 goals between 1994 and 2004. With his team won Malta International Football Tournament 1998 

He made his début on 8 February 1994.

International goals

Honours
FC Zürich
Swiss Cup: 1999–2000

References

External links

Profile at TFF

Living people
1971 births
Association football midfielders
Footballers from Georgia (country)
Expatriate footballers from Georgia (country)
Georgia (country) international footballers
FC Dinamo Tbilisi players
FC Spartak Vladikavkaz players
Trabzonspor footballers
FC Zürich players
FC Luzern players
FC Metalurh Donetsk players
Anorthosis Famagusta F.C. players
Russian Premier League players
Ukrainian Premier League players
Süper Lig players
Swiss Super League players
Cypriot First Division players
Expatriate footballers in Russia
Expatriate footballers in Turkey
Expatriate sportspeople from Georgia (country) in Turkey
Expatriate footballers in Switzerland
Expatriate footballers in Ukraine
Expatriate sportspeople from Georgia (country) in Ukraine
Expatriate footballers in Cyprus